is an online free-to-play role-playing game created by Happy Elements. It was released in Japan in May 2016 for Android and iOS devices. An anime television series adaptation by J.C.Staff aired from April 12 to June 28, 2018.

Characters

Other media
An anime television series adaptation by J.C.Staff aired from April 12 to June 28, 2018. Crunchyroll streamed the series. The series ran for 12 episodes.

Reception
The game has been downloaded over 5 million times in Japan.

Notes

References

External links
 
 

2016 video games
Android (operating system) games
Anime television series based on video games
Free-to-play video games
Gacha games
Japanese role-playing video games
J.C.Staff
IOS games
Japan-exclusive video games
Video games developed in Japan